Guilherme Santos may refer to:
Guilherme Santos (footballer, born 1988), Brazilian football leftback
Guilherme Santos (footballer, born 2001), Brazilian football winger